Fantôme is the sixth Japanese studio album (ninth overall) by Japanese-American singer-songwriter Hikaru Utada. Although Utada announced an indefinite hiatus from the public eye in August 2010, she continued writing and composing material with her father, Utada Teruzane, and long-term collaborator, Miyake Akira. Musically, Fantôme contains a collection of tracks that utilizes acoustic and stripped-down instrumentations, alongside influences of pop, electronic, and R&B music. The lyrical content delves into themes of grief, sadness, love, and death—mostly influenced by the death of her mother, her second marriage, and the birth of her son in 2015.

Commercially, Fantôme experienced success in Japan, reaching number one on the weekly Oricon Albums Chart with sales of over 253,000 units, becoming her eighth consecutive number-one album in the country. It additionally topped the US World Albums chart and has sold over a million copies worldwide. It won various awards, including Album of the Year at the Japan Record Awards and the Grand Prix prize at the CD Shop Awards. The singles "Sakura Nagashi", "Hanataba o Kimi ni", and "Manatsu no Tōriame" were released prior to the album's announcement, while "Michi" and "Nijikan Dake no Vacance" were dropped shortly before its release.

Background and recording
In July 2015, Utada announced on her blog that she had given birth to a baby boy and was working on a new album during the pregnancy. In March 2016, it was revealed by her team that she had returned from her five-year hiatus with two new digital singles, "Hanataba o Kimi ni" and "Manatsu no Tōriame", and a campaign called "New-Turn", with songs downloaded by Japanese fans via digital music services having part of their sales donated to planting cherry trees in areas damaged by the by 2011 Tōhoku earthquake.

On July 12, 2016, Utada posted on her Instagram account that she had finished recording for a new album. On August 8, the cover and track listing were revealed on Utada's web site. For the first time, Utada used Japanese titles for all the songs on the album. Fantôme was released physically in Japan and digitally worldwide on September 28, 2016, through Virgin Music and Universal Music Japan. This was her first record released following the 2013 merger of EMI Music Japan with Universal Music Japan. The album was released in two formats: a physical SHM-CD; and a digital download.

Critical reception

Upon its release, Fantôme received critical acclaim. Ryo Miyauchi of Unrecorded.mu rated the album with 70 points out of 100, commending the singer's songwriting and vulnerability, especially highlighted in the album tracks "Ningyo", "Tomodachi", and "Kōya no Ōkami". Miyauchi added that he believed the record's sound was similar to her previous albums: "Though Fantôme shows no sign from Utada of being nostalgic for who she once was, the album still sounds undoubtedly her. Fantôme creates an odd sense of time where it has one foot in the past and another slightly pointed to what’s next."

Commercial performance

Japan and Asia
In Japan, Fantôme debuted at number one on the Daily Oricon Albums Chart, selling 87,088 units. For its first week on the Weekly Oricon Albums Chart, it entered atop the chart with over 252,581 copies sold; It sold more copies than its competitor of the week, Exile's greatest hits album Extreme Best (2016). Fantôme became her ninth number one album, her first studio album since Heart Station (2008) to debut at the top position, but also resulted in becoming her lowest first week sales for one of her Japanese-language albums.

In its second week, it stayed at number 1 with 103,854 physical units sold, again outselling the nearest competitor by a wide margin. The next week, it stayed at number one, selling 63,207 units, thus becoming her only studio album besides her debut First Love to chart at the pole position for more than two weeks, and then further extending this feat by one more week. Likewise, Fantôme debuted at the top spot on the Japan Hot Albums and the Top Albums Sales charts, both hosted by Billboard Japan.

Alongside this, Utada's digital single "Michi" placed atop of the Radio Songs chart during the week of October 10, 2016. On November 9, 2016, Oricon revealed its new weekly Digital Albums Chart. Fantôme ranked at number one on the chart, selling 6,537 digital downloads. It topped the chart a second week, shifting an additional 3,993 downloads. According to Billboard Japan, Fantôme was the best-selling digital album of the year, as well as the third-best-selling physical album, according to Oricon. Overall, it thus became the top-selling album of the year in Japan. The album sold 569,963 physical units in 2016 and 117,259 in 2017, according to Oricon's respective yearly sales ranking, thus totalling 687,222 physical units sold by December 2017.

Other territories
Upon its overseas release on the iTunes Store, Fantôme debuted at number one in Japan, Finland, Slovenia and 7 other Asian territories. It reached the top ten in the United States, Australia, Canada, Sweden, New Zealand and a further 6 countries. Additionally, it entered the top 20 in the United Kingdom and 5 further countries. According to online publications, it was labelled as her most successful release internationally, and had beaten previous positions that her English records: Exodus (2004) and This Is The One (2009) experienced.

The album opened at number two on the US Billboard World Albums chart. It marked her first record to enter the World Albums chart, her first Japanese release to enter the US charts, and her first album to obtain a position in the US since This Is The One in 2009; it sold approximately 1,992 units in its first two days of sale. The following week, it reached number one and had sold over 3,500 units.

Promotion
Utada's website listed a schedule of magazine reviews and interviews about the album, internet interviews and TV appearances with performances with songs from the album, on shows like Music Station (where she performed "Sakura Nagashi" for the first time live), NHK's SONGS (where she performed "Michi", "Tomodachi" and "Hanataba o Kimi ni"), CX's Love Music and NTV's News Zero. An Internet live stream event was scheduled to happen on December 9, 2016, called Sanjudai wa Hodo-Hodo, where Utada answered fan questions and performed the songs "Boukyaku" and "Ningyo" live. Two guests had been announced, the rapper Kohh and the DJ Punpee.

Singles
Fantome is Utada's first Japanese-language studio album not to have any physical singles released. All the songs released as singles were distributed on online platforms exclusively. The first one was "Sakura Nagashi", the theme song of Evangelion: 3.0 You Can (Not) Redo, which was released on November 17, 2012, while she was still officially on hiatus. On April 15, 2016, "Hanataba o Kimi ni" and "Manatsu no Tōriame" were released, marking her official return to the music scene. The former became a big success for her, being certified double platinum for over 500,000 digital downloads and staying on the Billboard Japan Hot 100 over the course of the rest of the year, peaking at number 2. The latter received the award for "Video of The Year" at the 2016 MTV Video Music Awards Japan.

On September 13, 2016, shortly before the album's release, "Michi" was released to radio stations, and three days later as a digital download, while "Nijikan Dake no Vacance", a duet with Sheena Ringo, received a music video release. On January 19, 2017, the singer's 34th birthday, a music video for "Bōkyaku" (sung with Kohh) was also released.

Track listing
All tracks written by Hikaru Utada except where noted.

Personnel 
Credits adapted from the album’s liner notes.

Vocals 

 Hikaru Utada – lead vocals (all tracks)
 Ringo Sheena – featured vocals (track 4)
 Nariaki Obukuro – featured vocals (track 6)
 Kohh – featured vocals (track 9)

Instrumentation

Production

Technical

Artwork 

 Seida Yu – art direction
 Julien Mignot – photography
 Ogawa Kyohei – styling
 Inagaki Ryoji – hair, make-up

Charts

Weekly charts

Year-end charts

Sales and certifications

References

External links
Fantôme on Hikaru Utada's official web site

Hikaru Utada albums
2016 albums
Japanese-language albums
Universal Music Japan albums
Virgin Records albums